The 1981 NCAA Division III Lacrosse Championship was the second annual tournament to determine the national champions of NCAA Division III men's college lacrosse in the United States.

The tournament field included eight teams, with the final played at Boswell Field at the Hobart and William Smith Colleges in Geneva, New York. 

In a rematch of the 1980 final, hosts and defending champions Hobart defeated Cortland in the final, 10–8, to win their second Division III national title.

Bracket

See also
1981 NCAA Division I Men's Lacrosse Championship
1981 NCAA Division II Lacrosse Championship

References

NCAA Division III Men's Lacrosse Championship
NCAA Division III Men's Lacrosse Championship
NCAA Division III Men's Lacrosse